The inaugural 2017 season of Dana White's Contender Series included a total of 8 weekly shows. Viewers had a choice of a traditional commentary team, or alternate commentary provided by rapper Snoop Dogg and UFC Hall of Famer Urijah Faber. Commentators included active fighter Paul Felder who would go on to commentate on UFC events.

Week 1 - July 11

Contract awards 
The following fighters were awarded contracts with the UFC:
Kurt Holobaugh, and Boston Salmon
Zu Anyanwu while not being offered a contract on the show was brought in as a short-notice replacement for Justin Ledet at UFC Fight Night 116.

Week 2 - July 18

Contract awards 
The following fighters were awarded contracts with the UFC:
Sean O'Malley

Week 3 - July 25

Contract awards 
The following fighters were awarded contracts with the UFC:
Karl Roberson and Geoff Neal
Dan Ige while not being offered a contract on the show was brought in to face Charles Rosa, who was later replaced by Julio Arce at UFC 220.

Week 4 - August 1

Contract awards 
The following fighters were awarded contracts with the UFC:
Julian Marquez and Brandon Davis
Kyler Phillips while not being offered a contract on the show was brought in to compete on The Ultimate Fighter: Undefeated.

Week 5 - August 8

Contract awards 
The following fighters were awarded contracts with the UFC:
Mike Rodríguez and Alex Perez
Julio Arce while not being offered a contract on the show was brought in as a short-notice replacement for Dan Ige at UFC 220.

Week 6 - August 15

Contract awards 
The following fighters were awarded contracts with the UFC:
Charles Byrd and Grant Dawson

Week 7 - August 22

Contract awards 
The following fighters were awarded contracts with the UFC:
Benito Lopez and Joby Sanchez
Mike Santiago  was not awarded a contract on the show but one week later was signed to the UFC as a short notice replacement for Nick Hein at UFC Fight Night 115

Week 8 - August 29

Contract awards 
The following fighters were awarded contracts with the UFC:
Matt Frevola, Lauren Mueller, and Allen Crowder
Bevon Lewis was signed to a development league contract

References

Ultimate Fighting Championship television series